Prunum amabile is a species of sea snail, a marine gastropod mollusk in the family Marginellidae, the margin snails.

Distribution
P. amabile can be found in Atlantic waters, ranging from North Carolina to Brazil., in the Caribbean Sea and the Gulf of Mexico.

References

 
 Rosenberg, G., F. Moretzsohn, and E. F. García. 2009. Gastropoda (Mollusca) of the Gulf of Mexico, Pp. 579–699 in Felder, D.L. and D.K. Camp (eds.), Gulf of Mexico–Origins, Waters, and Biota. Biodiversity. Texas A&M Press, College Station, Texas.

Marginellidae
Gastropods described in 1852